The Earth Island Institute is a non-profit environmental group founded in 1982 by David Brower. Located in Berkeley, California, it supports activism around environmental issues through fiscal sponsorship that provides the administrative and organizational infrastructure for individual projects.

Earth Island Journal
Earth Island Institute publishes a quarterly periodical entitled Earth Island Journal, edited by Maureen Nandini Mitra. Content is largely dedicated to investigative pieces and showcases environmental grassroots movements as well as environmental reporting and commentary from around the world. The publication has received industry awards for "uncovering stories ignored by larger media outlets," including a 2019 Izzy Award for independent media.

Brower Youth Awards
Earth Island has presented the Brower Youth Awards, named for founder David Brower, to six young environmental leaders since 2000.

Dolphin-safe labeling
Earth Island Institute is the standard-bearer for dolphin-safe tuna labeling in the United States. The organization works to verify or reject domestic tuna as dolphin-safe.

Incubator projects
Earth Island Institute sponsors a number of fledgling activist groups which it refers to as Incubator Projects. Many have gone on to become independent 501(c)(3) organizations while others remain under the umbrella of the institute.
 Plastic Pollution Coalition  
 Rooted in Community

Alumni projects
As of March 2017, the following organizations were projects of Earth Island Institute before leaving to continue their environmental work as independent organizations:
 Bluewater Network (merged with Friends of the Earth)
 Energy Action Coalition 
 International Rivers  
 Rainforest Action Network  
 Sea Turtle Restoration Project

2013 Solomon Islands dolphin massacre

In January 2013, Fanalei villagers on the island of Malaita in the Solomon Islands slaughtered close to 900 dolphins in retaliation for a payment dispute with Earth Island Institute. The dolphin slaughter occurred after villagers refused to renew a memorandum of understanding with Earth Island Institute that expired in April 2012. Villagers claim EII promised them $2.4 million Solomon Island Dollars (about $335,000 U.S.) to stop trading dolphins and dolphin-derived products for two years, but only received $700,000.

Chairman Atkin Fakaia of a local villagers' association claimed that villagers had to kill the dolphins to trade the meat and teeth for money to survive in the local economy. Earth Island Institute Director Lawrence Makili accused the association of mishandling the first $300,000 invested under the original MOU. Makili accused the villagers' association of seizing funds and failing to distribute them.

See also
Summers v. Earth Island Institute

References

External links
 Earth Island Institute

Environmental organizations based in the San Francisco Bay Area
Organizations based in Berkeley, California
Politics of the San Francisco Bay Area
1982 establishments in California
Fiscal sponsorship organizations